2015 Kashima Antlers season.

J1 League

References

External links
 J.League official site

Kashima Antlers
Kashima Antlers seasons